Lost N Found is the ninth studio album by Singaporean singer JJ Lin, released on 31 December 2011 by Warner Music Taiwan.

Track listing
 "獨奏" (Prologue)
 "學不會" (Never Learn)
 "故事細膩" (The Story is Delicate)
 "那些你很冒險的夢" (Those Adventurous Dreams of Yours)
 "白羊夢" (White Goat Dream)
 "靈魂的共鳴" (Variation 25: Clash of the Souls)
 "We Together"
 "Cinderella"
 "白蘭花" (Streets of Old Shanghai)
 "陌生老朋友" (Dear Friend)
 "不存在的情人" (Nonexistent Lovers)
 "Love U U"

References

2011 albums
JJ Lin albums